Roman Olegovich Kryklia (Ukrainian: Роман Олегович Крикля; born October 11, 1991) is a Ukrainian heavyweight kickboxer currently signed to ONE Championship when he completes both Light Heavyweight and Heavyweight division in Kickboxing, where he is the inaugural and current ONE Light Heavyweight Kickboxing World Champion.

He is 2015 SUPERKOMBAT World Grand Prix runner-up, and won Kunlun Fight 80 and K-1 World GP 2016 Belgrade tournaments.

As of September 2022, Combat Press ranks him as the #3 heavyweight kickboxer in the world, while Beyond Kick ranks him at #4 as of October 2022.

Early life
Roman Kryklia was born in the city of Krasnohrad, Kharkov region in a nearly-dissolve Ukrainian SSR. At six years old he began training at the sports club "Burovik." His coach at the time was Valentin Nikolaevich Kozhushko. With the club "Burovik", Kryklia began to fight at the Ukrainian Kenpokai Karate and Kickboxing championships, among children and youth, and won a number of medals.

In 2008 in the city of Lutsk, he became the youth champion of Ukraine in kickboxing and received the title of Master of Sports in Kickboxing. In 2008, he began to train in the city of Kharkiv, at the club "Maximus," with coach Maxim Nikolaevich Kiyko and the famous Kharkov boxing trainer Victor Nikolaevich Demchenko.

During his studies at the Kharkiv National Automobile and Highway University, he defended the honor of the University at the Kickboxing Championship of Ukraine among students for four years (2012–2015 years), and he ranked first. He was the silver Thai Boxing champion of Ukraine among amateurs in the city of Odessa (2010).

Kickboxing career

Early career
In October 2012, Kryklia made his professional debut against Tomáš Možný at Nitrianska noc bojovníkov 2012. He won the fight by decision. Kryklia would go on to amass a 4-3 record, winning four of his next seven fights. In January 2015, he participated in the Yangame's Fight Night 2 light heavyweight tournament. He won both the semifinal bout against Jiří Stariat and the final bout against Radovan Kulla by decision.
 
After his first tournament title win, Krylia won three of his next four fights, including notable victories over Igor Mihaljević and Sergej Maslobojev. He then took part in the 2015 Tatneft Cup heavyweight tournament, scoring knockouts of Claudiu Istrate in the semifinals and Daniel Lentie in the finals.

SUPERKOMBAT Fighting Championship
Two months later, Krylia would sign with the biggest kickboxing promotion in Europe to participate in their SUPERKOMBAT Heavyweight Grand Prix. He won a unanimous decision against Ivan Pavle in the semifinals, but lost to Tarik Khbabez by decision in the finals.

After losing to Khabez, Kryklia went on a thirteen fight winning streak, which began with decision wins against Konstantin Gluhov and Jahfarr Wilnis. In June 2016, he won the A1 WGP qualification tournament by knocking out Thomas Vanneste in the semifinals, and by forcing Daniel Lentie to withdraw at the end of the first round in the final. In the semifinals of the A1 Grand Prix itself, Kryklia faced Daniel Lentie for the third time in his career, and won for the third time as well, beating Lentie by decision. He won the tournament with a first-round TKO of Arnold Oborotov.

K-1
Just two weeks later, Kryklia entered the 2016 K-1 Europe heavyweight tournament. Kryklia won the quarterfinals against Bosnian Bahrudin Mahmić, semifinals against Atha Kasapis and finals against Fabio Kwasi in the same manner - knocking all three with a knee strike. For his last fight of 2016, Kryklia was scheduled to fight Stéphane Susperregui at Nuit des Champions 2016. He won the fight by majority decision.

Kunlun Fight
During Monte Carlo Fighting Masters, Kryklia fought Fabrice Aurieng for both the Prince Albert's Cup and the Monte Carlo FM heavyweight title. He won the fight by TKO, after Aurieng's corner threw in the towel in the second round.

In December 2017, Kryklia fought in the Kunlun Fight heavyweight tournament, held at the KLF 68 event. He won the quarterfinal bout against Ning Tianshuai by a first-round TKO and the semifinal bout against Felipe Micheletti by unanimous decision. He lost the final fight against Iraj Azizpour by an extra round decision, despite coming into the fight as a favorite.

Kryklia fought Yuksel Ayaydin at MFC 7, in Ayaydin's retirement fight, winning the fight by decision. He afterwards fought Daniel Svkor for the WAKO World heavyweight tile, winning by a second-round knockout.

In the semifinals of the 2018 FEA World Grand Prix, Kryklia was scheduled to fight a rubber match with Tomáš Hron, with each fighter holding a win over the other. He won the fight by unanimous decision, and went on to face Tsotne Rogava in the final. The fight with Rogava went into an extra round, after which Kryklia won a decision. 

At Kunlun Fight 80, Kryklia once again fought in the KLF heavyweight tournament. He defeated Martin Pacas by unanimous decision in the quarterfinal, and Rade Opacic by a second round TKO in the semifinal, before fighting a rematch with Iraj Azizpour in the finals. Kryklia was more successful in their second fight, winning a unanimous decision.

ONE Championship

ONE Kickboxing Light Heavyweight Champion
On November 16, 2019, Roman Kryklia defeated Tarik Khbabez by TKO to become the inaugural ONE Light Heavyweight Kickboxing World Champion.

Kryklia was expected to defend his belt against Andrei Stoica at ONE Infinity 1, but the light heavyweight title fight postponed due to coronavirus. Kryklia was rescheduled to defend the ONE Light Heavyweight Kickboxing World Championship against Murat Aygün at ONE Championship: Big Bang on December 4, 2020. The fight with Aygun fell through, as one of Kryklia's corner-men tested positive for COVID-19. 

Accordingly, Aygun received a new opponent, while Kryklia was scheduled to fight the mandatory challenger Andrei Stoica, who took the fight on short notice being announced only a few days before the match, at ONE Championship: Collision Course. At the official weigh in, Kryklia weighed more than Stoica. Eventually, the fight was won by Kryklia by unanimous decision, who was in control during the match.

Kryklia was scheduled to make the his second ONE Kickboxing Light Heavyweight title defense against Murat Aygün at ONE Championship: NextGen on October 29, 2021. However, Aygün was pulled from the fight and Kryklia was instead scheduled to face Iraj Azizpour for the inaugural ONE Kickboxing Heavyweight World Championship. However, due to an undisclosed medical issue, Kryklia withdrew from the fight.

Kryklia was rebooked against Murat Aygün for January 14, 2022 at ONE: Heavy Hitters. The fight was later postponed for  ONE: Full Circle on February 25, 2022. Kryklia defeated Aygün via first-round knockout.

ONE Kickboxing Heavyweight Grand Prix
Kryklia faced Guto Inocente in the semifinals of the ONE Heavyweight Kickboxing World Grand Prix Tournament at ONE 161 on September 29, 2022. He won the fight by a first-round knockout. Kryklia knocked Inocente down twice before the one-minute mark of the opening round, which prompted the referee to wave the fight off.

Kryklia was booked to face Iraj Azizpour in a trilogy bout in the finals of the ONE Heavyweight Kickboxing World Grand Prix Tournament at ONE 163 on November 18, 2022. He won the fight by a second-round knockout, after having been dropped by Azizpour in the opening frame.

Doping suspension 
On April 18, 2018, it was announced that Kryklia failed a drug test prior to Nuit des Champions 2016, testing positive for two banned substances, including meldonium and clenbuterol. He was suspended for 4 years by National Anti-Doping Agency of France (AFLD) from the participation in all sports events organized or authorized by French sports federations until 7 May 2022. As a result, his majority decision win against Stéphane Susperregui was changed to a no contest.

Titles 
ONE Championship
ONE Light Heavyweight Kickboxing World Championship (One time, current) 
Two successful title defenses
ONE Heavyweight Kickboxing World Championship (One time, current)
2022 ONE Heavyweight Kickboxing World Grand Prix 
Tournament Winner
Performance of the Night (Three times) 
2022 Kickboxing Fighter of the Year
2022 Kickboxing Knockout of the Year 
2022 Kickboxing Fight of the Year 

Kunlun Fight
2019 Kunlun Fight Super Heavyweight Tournament Champion

FEA World Grand Prix
2018 FEA World Grand Prix Tournament Champion

Monte Carlo Fighting Masters
2017 Monte Carlo Fighting Masters Heavyweight Champion +94.2 kg. 
2017 H.S.H. Prince Albert II of Monaco's Cup +94.2 kg.

Combat Press 
2016 Combat Press Fighter of the Year nomination

K-1
2016 K-1 World GP Euro 2016 -95kg Championship Tournament Champion

A1
2016 A1 WGP Final Heavyweight Tournament Champion
2016 A1 WGP Part 3 Heavyweight Tournament Champion

SUPERKOMBAT Fighting Championship
2015 SUPERKOMBAT World Grand Prix 2015 Final +96 kg/211 lb Tournament Runner-Up

Tatneft Cup
2015 Tatneft Cup 2015 +91 kg/200 lb Champion

Yangame's Fight Night
2015 Yangame's Fight Night 2: TATNEFT TNA Collizion +80 kg/176 lb Champion

Kickboxing record

 
|-  style="text-align=center; background:#cfc;"
| 2022-11-19|| Win ||align=left| Iraj Azizpour || ONE 163, Tournament Final || Kallang, Singapore || TKO (Punches) || 2
|-
! style=background:white colspan=9 |
|-
|-  style="text-align=center; background:#cfc;"
| 2022-09-29 || Win ||align=left| Guto Inocente || ONE 161, Tournament Semifinal || Kallang, Singapore || TKO (Head Kick) || 1
|-
|-  style="text-align=center; background:#cfc;"
| 2022-02-25 || Win ||align=left| Murat Aygun || ONE: Full Circle || Kallang, Singapore || KO (Kick to the Body and Punches) || 1 
|-
| style="background:white; font-weight:bold" colspan=9 | 
|-  style="text-align=center; background:#cfc;"
| 2020-12-18 || Win ||align=left| Andrei Stoica || ONE Championship: Collision Course || Kallang, Singapore || Decision (Unanimous)  || 5 
|-
| style="background:white; font-weight:bold" colspan=9 | 
|-
|-  style="text-align=center; background:#cfc;"
| 2019-11-16|| Win ||align=left| Tarik Khbabez || ONE Championship: Age Of Dragons || Beijing, China || TKO (3 Knockdown Rule)  || 2  
|-
| style="background:white; font-weight:bold" colspan=9 |
|-  style="text-align:center; background:#cfc;"
| 2019-02-24|| Win ||align=left| Iraj Azizpour || Kunlun Fight 80 - Heavyweight Tournament, Final || Shanghai, China || Decision (Unanimous) || 3 
|-
| style="background:white; font-weight:bold" colspan=9 |
|-  style="text-align:center; background:#cfc;"
| 2019-02-24|| Win ||align=left| Rade Opačić || Kunlun Fight 80 - Heavyweight Tournament, Semi Finals || Shanghai, China || TKO (Five Knockdowns/Punches) || 2 
|-  style="text-align:center; background:#cfc;"
| 2019-02-24|| Win ||align=left| Martin Pacas|| Kunlun Fight 80 - Heavyweight Tournament, Quarter Finals || Shanghai, China || Decision (Unanimous) || 3 
|-
|-  style="text-align:center; background:#cfc;"
| 2018-12-07 || Win ||align=left| Sam Tevette  ||Tatneft Cup 2018 Final ||  Kazan, Russia || Decision  || 4 
|-
|-  style="text-align:center; background:#cfc;"
| 2018-10-06|| Win||align=left| Tsotne Rogava || FEA World Grand Prix, Final|| Moldova || Extra Round Decision (Unanimous)|| 4
|-
| style="background:white; font-weight:bold;" colspan=9| 
|-
|-  style="text-align:center; background:#cfc;"
| 2018-10-06|| Win||align=left| Tomáš Hron || FEA World Grand Prix, Semi Finals|| Moldova || Decision (Unanimous)|| 3 
|-
|-  style="text-align:center; background:#cfc;"
| 2018-06-30|| Win||align=left| Daniel Škvor || Monte-Carlo Fighting Trophy|| Monaco || KO|| 2 
|-
| style="background:white; font-weight:bold;" colspan=9| 
|-
|-  style="text-align:center; background:#cfc;"
| 2018-05-03|| Win||align=left| Yuksel Ayaydin  || MFC 7|| France || Decision   || 3 
|-
|-  style="text-align:center; background:#fbb;"
| 2018-02-04|| Loss||align=left| Iraj Azizpour || Kunlun Fight 69 Heavyweight Tournament, Final || China || Ex. R Decision (Majority)  || 4
|-
| style="background:white; font-weight:bold;" colspan=9| 
|-  style="text-align:center; background:#cfc;"
| 2018-02-04|| Win||align=left| Felipe Micheletti || Kunlun Fight 69 Heavyweight Tournament, Semi Finals || China || Decision (Unanimous)  || 3 
|- 
|-  style="text-align:center; background:#cfc;"
| 2017-12-17|| Win||align=left| Ning Tianshuai || Kunlun Fight 68 Heavyweight Tournament, Quarter Finals || China || TKO (Doctor Stoppage/ Cut)  || 1 
|- 
|-  style="text-align:center; background:#cfc;"
| 2017-11-25 || Win ||align=left| Nordine Mahieddine || Nuit Des Champions || Marseille, France || Decision || 3
|-
|-  style="text-align:center; background:#fbb;"
| 2017-07-27 || Loss ||align=left| Tomáš Hron || Yangames Fight Night 2017 || Prague, Czech Republic || Decision || 3
|-
|-  style="text-align:center; background:#cfc;"
| 2017-06-30 || Win ||align=left| Fabrice Aurieng  || Monte Carlo Fighting Masters || Monte Carlo, Monaco || TKO (Towel Thrown) || 2 
|-
| style="background:white; font-weight:bold" colspan=9 |
|- 
|-  style="text-align:center; background:#c5d2ea;"
| 2016-11-19 || NC ||align=left| Stéphane Susperregui || Nuit des Champions 2016 || Marseille, France || No contest || 3
|-
| style="background:white; font-weight:bold" colspan=9 |
|-  style="text-align:center; background:#cfc;"
| 2016-10-27 || Win ||align=left| Fabio Kwasi || K-1 World GP 2016 -95kg Championship Tournament || Belgrade, Serbia || KO (Knee)||2 
|-
| style="background:white; font-weight:bold;" colspan=9| 
|-  style="text-align:center; background:#cfc;"
| 2016-10-27 || Win ||align=left| Atha Kasapis  || K-1 World GP 2016 -95kg Championship Tournament || Belgrade, Serbia || KO (Knee)||3 
|-  style="text-align:center; background:#cfc;"
| 2016-10-27 || Win ||align=left| Bahrudin Mahmić  || K-1 World GP 2016 -95kg Championship Tournament || Belgrade, Serbia || KO (Knee)||1
|-  style="text-align:center; background:#cfc;"
| 2016-10-13|| Win ||align=left| Arnold Oborotov || Partouche Kickboxing Tour 2016 - Final
||  France || TKO (Left hook and knee) || 1   
|-
| style="background:white; font-weight:bold" colspan=9 |
|-  style="text-align:center; background:#cfc;"
| 2016-10-13|| Win ||align=left| Daniel Lentie || Partouche Kickboxing Tour 2016 - Final ||  France || Decision || 3  
|-  style="text-align:center; background:#cfc;"
| 2016-06-10 || Win ||align=left| Daniel Lentie || Partouche Kickboxing Tour, Final|| Toulon, France || Abandon || 1
|-
| style="background:white; font-weight:bold" colspan=9 |
|-  style="text-align:center; background:#cfc;"
| 2016-06-10 || Win ||align=left| Thomas Vanneste || Partouche Kickboxing Tour, Semi Finals || Toulon, France || TKO (corner stoppage) || 2
|-  style="text-align:center; background:#cfc;"
| 2016-01-09 || Win ||align=left| Jahfarr Wilnis || Kunlun Fight 36 ||  Shanghai, China || Decision || 3  
|-  style="text-align:center; background:#cfc;"
| 2015-12-26 || Win || align=left| Konstantin Gluhov|| Akhmat Fight Show || Grozny, Russia || Decision (Unanimous) || 3   
|-  style="text-align:center; background:#fbb;"
| 2015-11-07 || Loss ||align=left| Tarik Khbabez || SUPERKOMBAT World Grand Prix 2015 Final, Final || Bucharest, Romania || Decision (unanimous) || 3  
|-
| style="background:white; font-weight:bold;" colspan=9| 
|-  style="text-align:center; background:#cfc;"
| 2015-11-07 || Win ||align=left| Ivan Pavle || SUPERKOMBAT World Grand Prix 2015 Final, Semi Finals || Bucharest, Romania || Decision (unanimous) || 3  
|-  style="text-align:center; background:#cfc;"
| 2015-09-04 || Win ||align=left| Daniel Lentie || Tatneft Cup 2015 Final || Kazan, Russia || KO || 1 
|-
| style="background:white; font-weight:bold;" colspan=9| 
|-  style="text-align:center; background:#cfc;"
| 2015-08-04 || Win ||align=left| Claudiu Istrate || Tatneft Cup 2015 Semifinal || Kazan, Russia || TKO || 1 
|-  style="text-align:center; background:#cfc;"
| 2015-06-07 || Win ||align=left| Sergej Maslobojev || Kunlun Fight 26 - Super Heavyweight Tournament, Reserve Fight || Chongqing, China || KO   || 3 
|-  style="text-align:center; background:#cfc;"
| 2015-04-29 || Win ||align=left| Igor Mihaljević || Tatneft Cup 2015 - 1st selection 1/4 final || Kazan, Russia || KO (Knee to the Head) || 2 
|-  style="text-align:center; background:#fbb;"
| 2015-03-17 || Loss ||align=left| Jahfarr Wilnis || Kunlun Fight 21 - Super Heavyweight Tournament, Quarter Finals || Sanya, China || Ext. R. Decision || 4   
|-  style="text-align:center; background:#cfc;"
| 2015-02-21 || Win ||align=left| Dexter Suisse || Tatneft Cup 2015 - 3rd selection 1/8 final || Kazan, Russia || KO || 1 
|-  style="text-align:center; background:#cfc;"
| 2015-01-17 || Win ||align=left| Radovan Kulla || Yangame's Fight Night 2: TATNEFT TNA Collizion, Final || Prague, Czech Republic || Decision || 3  
|-
| style="background:white; font-weight:bold;" colspan=9| 
|-  style="text-align:center; background:#cfc;"
| 2015-01-17 || Win ||align=left| Jiří Stariat || Yangame's Fight Night 2: TATNEFT TNA Collizion, Semi Finals || Prague, Czech Republic || Decision || 3  
|-  style="text-align:center; background:#cfc;"
| 2015-01-03 || Win ||align=left| Tomáš Hron || Kunlun Fight 15 - Super Heavyweight Tournament, Final 16 || Nanjing, China || КО (High Kick) || 1  
|-  style="text-align:center; background:#fbb;"
| 2014-01-31 || Loss ||align=left| Kirk Krouba || Tatneft Cup 2014 – 2nd selection 1/8 final || Kazan, Russia || Decision (Unanimous)  || 3 
|-  style="text-align:center; background:#cfc;"
| 2013-12-14 || Win ||align=left| Pacôme Assi || Victory || Paris, France ||Decision ||3 
|-  style="text-align:center; background:#fbb;"
| 2013-09-14 || Loss ||align=left| Martin Pacas || Muay Thai Evening 3 || Trenčín, Slovakia || Decision  || 3 
|-  style="text-align:center; background:#cfc;"
| 2013-06-15 || Win ||align=left| Pacôme Assi || Time Fight 3 || Tours, France || TKO (cut) || 1 
|-  style="text-align:center; background:#cfc;"
| 2013-02-22 || Win ||align=left| Yuri Dobko || Muaythai Night || Moscow, Russia || TKO (injury) || 3 
|-  style="text-align:center; background:#fbb;"
| 2012-11-18 || Loss ||align=left| Valentin Slavikovskiy || Knockout-Show Mustang || Minsk, Belarus || Decision  || 3 
|-  style="text-align:center; background:#cfc;"
| 2012-10-27 || Win ||align=left| Tomáš Možný || Nitrianska noc bojovníkov 2012 || Prague, Czech Republic || Decision  || 3
|-

|Legend:

See also
 List of male kickboxers
 List of ONE Championship champions

References

External links
 Muaythaitv profile

1991 births
Living people
People from Krasnohrad
Ukrainian male kickboxers 
Heavyweight kickboxers
Ukrainian Muay Thai practitioners
Sportspeople from Kharkiv
Kunlun Fight kickboxers
SUPERKOMBAT kickboxers
ONE Championship kickboxers
Doping cases in kickboxing
Ukrainian sportspeople in doping cases
Kickboxing champions
Kunlun Fight kickboxing champions
ONE Championship champions